Gertrude Howard (October 13, 1892 –  September 30, 1934) was an American actress of the silent and early sound film eras.

Biography
Born in 1892, Howard performed in the chorus of The Wife Hunters (1911) on Broadway. She broke into films in 1925, appearing in The Circus Cyclone, directed by Albert Rogell. In 1927, she played the wife of Uncle Tom in Uncle Tom's Cabin. In 1927, The Pittsburgh Courier stated that she was the "highest salaried colored actress in Hollywood". She appeared mostly in minor or supporting film roles, such as Queenie in the original version of Show Boat (1929), and Martha in Christy Cabanne's Conspiracy.

Her appearance as Beulah Thorndyke in I'm No Angel (1933), led to her being forever linked to Mae West with the famous line, "Beulah, peel me a grape".

In Howard's short career she would appear in twenty-two films. That career was cut short by her untimely death in 1934 at the age of 41. Mae West helped raise funds for her funeral.

Filmography

(Per AFI database)

The Circus Cyclone (1925) as Mrs. Jackson
Easy Pickings (1927) as Mandy
On Your Toes (1927) as Mammy
South Sea Love (1927) as Moana
Uncle Tom's Cabin  (1927) as Aunt Chloe
Hearts in Dixie  (1929) as Emmy
Show Boat  (1929) as Queenie (uncredited)
His Captive Woman  (1929) as Lavoris Smythe
Synthetic Sin (1929) as Cassie
Conspiracy  (1930) as Martha
Guilty? (1930) as Lucy
Father's Son (1931) as Dinah
The Prodigal (1931) as Naomi
Penrod and Sam (1931) as Delia - Schofield's Maid (uncredited)
Consolation Marriage (1931) as Kate - Mary's Maid (uncredited)
Secret Service (1931) as Martha Polk (uncredited)
Strangers in Love (1932) as Snowball, Servant
Forbidden Trail (1932) as Angelina
I'm No Angel (1933) as Beulah
The Fighting Code (1933) as Housekeeper Martha
George White's Scandals (1934) as Black Woman (uncredited)
Peck's Bad Boy (1934) as Martha the Maid
Carolina (1934) as Minor Role (uncredited)

References

External links

Actresses from Arkansas
American silent film actresses
20th-century American actresses
American film actresses
African-American actresses
Actors from Hot Springs, Arkansas
1892 births
1934 deaths
20th-century African-American women
20th-century African-American people